The women's shot put event at the 2015 African Games was held on 17 September.

Results

References

Shot
2015 in women's athletics